Richmond Valley Council (RVC) is a local government area on the Northern Rivers region of north-eastern New South Wales, Australia. The area under management is located adjacent to the Bruxner Highway, Pacific Highway, and the North Coast railway line.

It is a rural area for the most part, with most industries involving cattle and crop growing, such as sugar cane, wheat, and pecan plantation.

The mayor of the Richmond Valley Council is Cr. Robert Mustow, an independent politician.

History 
Following a petition of 76 ratepayers, elections were held 22 March 1880 for the Casino Council.

Heritage listings 
The Richmond Valley Council has a number of heritage-listed sites, including:
 High Conservation Value Old Growth forest

Towns and localities

Demographics 
At the 2016 census, there were  people in the Richmond Valley local government area, of these 49.5 per cent were male and 50.5 per cent were female. Aboriginal and Torres Strait Islander people made up 6.6 per cent of the population, which was significantly higher than the national and state averages of 2.5 per cent. The median age of people in the Richmond Valley area was 42 years, which was marginally higher than the national median of 37 years. Children aged 0 – 14 years made up 20.8 per cent of the population and people aged 65 years and over made up 19.6 per cent of the population. Of people in the area aged 15 years and over, 47.6 per cent were married and 13.7 per cent were either divorced or separated.

When compared with total population growth of Australia for the same periods, being 5.78 per cent and 8.32 per cent respectively, population growth in the Richmond Valley local government area was significantly lower than the national average. The median weekly income for residents within the Richmond Valley area was marginally lower than the national average.

At the 2011 census, the proportion of residents in the Richmond Valley local government area who stated their ancestry as Australian or Anglo-Celtic exceeded 86 per cent of all residents (national average was 65.2 per cent). In excess of 16 per cent of all residents in the Richmond Valley at the 2011 census nominated no religious affiliation, compared to the national average of 22.3 per cent. Meanwhile, affiliation with Christianity exceeded 66 per cent, which was significantly higher than the national average of 50.2 per cent. As at the census date, compared to the national average, households in the Richmond Valley local government area had a significantly lower than average proportion (3.3 per cent) where two or more languages are spoken (national average was 20.4 per cent); and a significantly higher proportion (93.8 per cent) where English only was spoken at home (national average was 76.8 per cent).

Council

Current composition and election method
Richmond Valley Council is composed of seven councillors, including the mayor, for a fixed four-year term of office. The mayor is directly elected while the six other councillors are elected proportionally as one entire ward. The most recent election was held on 4 December 2021, and the makeup of the council, including the mayor, is as follows:

The current Council, elected in 2021, is:

See also

 Local government areas of New South Wales

References 

 
Local government areas of New South Wales
Northern Rivers
2000 establishments in Australia